Manimala is an Indian actress, who appeared predominantly in Tamil movie industry, in lead and supporting roles. She has acted in movies such as Anbu Karangal, Vallavanukku Vallavan, Motor Sundaram Pillai and Periya Idathu Penn.

Filmography
This list is incomplete; you can help by expanding it.

Tamil

 Periya Idathu Penn (1963)...Thillaiammal
 Panakkara Kudumbam (1964)...Sivagami
 Anbu Karangal (1965)...Anandhi
 Kaakum Karangal (1965)
 Anandhi (1965)...Sivakami
 Thazhampoo (1965)...Pakiyum
 Vallavanukku Vallavan (1965)...Geeta
 Poojaikku Vandha Malar (1965)...Mãlã
 Motor Sundaram Pillai (1966)
 Ethirigal Jakkirathai (1967)...Lakshmi
 Paal Manam (1967)
 Karpooram (1967)
 Nilave Nee Satchi (1970)
 Kalyana Oorvalam (1970)
 Patham Pasali (1970)
 Justice Viswanathan (1971)...Kanchana
 Maalai Sooda Vaa (1976)
 Annakili (1976)
 Unakkaga Naan (1976)
 Kavari Maan (1979)
 Theeratha Vilayattu Pillai (1982)
 Samayapurathu Satchi (1983)
 Anbulla Rajinikanth (1984)
 Sindhu Bhairavi (1985)...Sindhu's mother
 Nallavan (1988)...Guru and Raja's mother
 Rickshaw Mama (1992)...Sridevi's Maid

Telugu
 Eedu Jodu (1963)
 Pidugu Ramudu (1966)...Hema
 Marina Manishi (1970)...Janaki
 Athalu Kodallu (1971)
 Manasu Mangalyam (1971)...Amrutha
 Basti Bulbul (1971)
 Andala Ramudu (1973)...Raani

Kannada
 Mr. Rajkumar (1970)

Malayalam
 Kanyakumari (1974)
 Rasaleela (1975)
 Ithaanente Vazhi (1978)...Seetha
 Vivahithare Ithile (1986)
 Rithubhedam (1987)
 Midhya (1990)
 Pookkalam Varavayi (1991)

References

External links
 

20th-century Indian actresses
Tamil actresses
Living people
Actresses in Tamil cinema
Actresses in Telugu cinema
Actresses in Kannada cinema
Actresses in Malayalam cinema
Indian film actresses
Year of birth missing (living people)